This list of rail accidents in Turkey provides details of significant railway crashes in Turkey involving railway rolling stocks and with fatalities.

References

 
Turkey
Train accidents